Marco Mariani (born 25 December 1992) is an Italian professional footballer who plays as a midfielder. He played in the fourth tier of football in Italy for Bellaria – Igea and Santarcangelo.

Career
Born in Atri, Abruzzo, Mariani started his career at Abruzzan club Renato Curi – Angolana. He spent 2 seasons with the club in Serie D. In 2011, he was signed by professional club Bellaria – Igea Marina, which he made 24 starts in his first Serie C2 season for the Romagna-based club.

On 28 June 2012 he followed former Bellaria coach Nicola Campedelli to join another Romagnol club Cesena, which the club president was Igor, Nicola's brother. The club also signed team-mates Caio De Cenco, Daniele Fioretti and Daniele Forte from Bellaria. However Mariani was not included in the club's Serie B plan, which Mariani returned to Bellaria for 2012–13 season. The club also signed goalkeeper Andrea Rossini from Cesena (& Parma).

On 23 June 2013 Mariani remained in that region but for Santarcangelo di Romagna. Santarcangelo also signed Francesco Urso and Giacomo Bassoli (in January) from Cesena. Santarcangelo qualified to 2014–15 Serie C as the 5th of Group B of 2013–14 Serie C2.

References

External links
 AIC profile (data by football.it) 

Italian footballers
A.C. Bellaria Igea Marina players
A.C. Cesena players
Santarcangelo Calcio players
Serie C players
Association football midfielders
Sportspeople from the Province of Teramo
Footballers from Abruzzo
1992 births
Living people